Richard Patrick (born 1946) is a Canadian-born sports executive. He is the part-owner, president and alternate governor of the Washington Capitals of the National Hockey League (NHL). He is the son of Muzz Patrick, the grandson of Lester Patrick, the grandnephew of Frank Patrick, and the cousin of both Craig Patrick and Glenn Patrick.

Early life and education
Patrick graduated from Kent School in 1964 where he captained the hockey team and rowed on the varsity crew.  He then attended and graduated from Dartmouth College in 1968.

References

External links
Dick Patrick's staff profile at Eliteprospects.com
Profile of Dick Patrick on Dartmouth College's athletics website.

1946 births
Living people
Dartmouth College alumni
Kent School alumni
National Hockey League team presidents
Stanley Cup champions
Washington Capitals executives
Washington Capitals owners